Sir Antony Arthur Acland  (12 March 1930 – 8 September 2021) was a British diplomat and a provost of Eton College.

Early life 
Antony Acland was the second son of Bridget Susan (Barnett) and Brigadier Peter Acland. He was educated at Eton College, then in 1948 joined the Royal Artillery with a post-war "emergency commission". After short army service he went up to Christ Church, Oxford, gaining a BA degree in Philosophy, Politics and Economics in 1953 (later upgraded to MA). After leaving Oxford in 1953 he went straight into the Foreign Office (FO).

Career 
After studying at the Middle East Centre for Arab Studies, Acland was posted to Dubai and then Kuwait, then back to the FO as Assistant Private Secretary to the Foreign Secretary (Selwyn Lloyd, then Lord Home) 1959–62. He then served at the UK Mission to the UN, first in New York City 1962–66, then at Geneva 1966–68. Back at the Foreign and Commonwealth Office (FCO) he was head of the Arabian department 1970–72.

Acland was Principal Private Secretary to the Foreign Secretary (Sir Alec Douglas-Home, then James Callaghan) 1972–75. He was Ambassador to Luxembourg 1975–77 and to Spain 1977–79. He was Deputy Under-Secretary at the FCO 1979–82, a post which then entailed chairing the Joint Intelligence Committee. In 1982 he was promoted to Permanent Under-Secretary and head of the Diplomatic Service. Argentina invaded the Falkland Islands in April 1982 and Acland came into collision with the Prime Minister, Margaret Thatcher, over the diplomatic response. At one point during a heated discussion he threatened to resign, whereupon Thatcher backed down and said "All right, no more Foreign Office bashing."

Acland was Ambassador to the United States at Washington, D.C., 1986–91, then retired from the Diplomatic Service and was Provost of Eton College 1991–2000.

Acland was a member of the Founding Council of the Rothermere American Institute at Oxford, helping to raise funds for the Institute's building and library.

Honours 
Acland was appointed Companion of the Order of St Michael and St George in the 1976 New Year Honours and made a Knight Commander of the Royal Victorian Order in November of that year after the Queen's state visit to Luxembourg, after which he was styled "Sir Antony Acland". He was given the additional knighthood of Knight Commander of the Order of St Michael and St George in the 1982 Birthday Honours and promoted to Knight Grand Cross of that same order in the 1986 Birthday Honours and Knight Grand Cross of the Royal Victorian Order in the 1991 Birthday Honours. He was Chancellor of the Order of St Michael and St George between 1994 and 2005. In 2001 he was given the rare honour of appointment as a Knight of the Order of the Garter.

Personal life 
In 1956, Acland married Clare Anne Verdon; they had a daughter and two sons, including Simon Acland. Clare died in 1984; in 1987 he married Jennifer McGougan.

He died in September 2021, at the age of 91. His death came one day before that of fellow Knight of the Garter Sir Timothy Colman.

Ancestry

References

Sources 

1930 births
2021 deaths
Antony Arthur
People educated at Eton College
Royal Artillery officers
Alumni of Christ Church, Oxford
Members of HM Diplomatic Service
Principal Private Secretaries to the Secretary of State for Foreign and Commonwealth Affairs
Ambassadors of the United Kingdom to Luxembourg
Ambassadors of the United Kingdom to Spain
Chairs of the Joint Intelligence Committee (United Kingdom)
Permanent Under-Secretaries of State for Foreign Affairs
Ambassadors of the United Kingdom to the United States
Provosts of Eton College
Knights of the Garter
Knights Grand Cross of the Order of St Michael and St George
Knights Grand Cross of the Royal Victorian Order
20th-century British diplomats